Prunus × subhirtella, the winter-flowering cherry, spring cherry, or rosebud cherry, is the scientific name  for the hybrid between Prunus itosakura and Prunus incisa. It is a small deciduous flowering tree originating in Japan, but unknown in the wild.

References

External links 
 
 

Hybrid prunus
Cherry blossom
subhirtella